Jolyot is a surname. Notable people with the surname include:

Claude Prosper Jolyot de Crébillon (1707–1777), French novelist
Pascal Jolyot (born 1958), French fencer
Prosper Jolyot de Crébillon (1674–1762), French poet and tragedian

French-language surnames